Vigny may refer:

 Vigny, Moselle, a commune in the Moselle department
 Vigny, Val-d'Oise, a commune in the Val-d'Oise department
 Alfred de Vigny (1797-1863), French writer